Ludwig I of Württemberg ( 1098 – 1158) was Count of Wirtemberg. He reigned from 1143 until 1158 as the third ruler of Württemberg and first in his family line to do so. He acted as a member of the courts for Emperor Conrad III and Emperor Frederick I Barbarossa.

Ludwig I is supposed to have been the son of Konrad II and his wife Hadelwig. Together with his brother Emicho he appears from 1134 till 1154 respective 1139 till 1154 at the court of king Konrad III and emperor Friedrich I, Barbarossa. He presumably was Vogt of the Denkendorf monastery.

References

1090s births
1158 deaths
12th-century counts of Württemberg
Year of birth uncertain